Michał Przysiężny was the defending champion but decided not to participate.

Matthew Ebden won the title, defeating Yūichi Sugita in the final, 6–3, 6–2.

Seeds

Draw

Finals

Top half

Bottom half

References
 Main Draw
 Qualifying Draw

Dunlop World Challenge - Singles
2013 Men's Singles
2013 ATP Challenger Tour